The Bledsoe County Courthouse is a historic building in Pikeville, Tennessee. It serves as the courthouse for Bledsoe County, Tennessee. It was built with red bricks by the Fall City Construction Company of Louisville, Kentucky, and completed in 1909. In 1908, the company sued Bledsoe County because they had failed to pay $18,000 for the construction. The county argued it had not been built as requested. 

The building was designed by W.K. Brown & Brothers, an architectural firm from Chattanooga, Tennessee, in the Classical Revival style. It has been listed on the National Register of Historic Places since March 30, 1995.

References

External links

	
National Register of Historic Places in Bledsoe County, Tennessee
Neoclassical architecture in Tennessee
Government buildings completed in 1909
Courthouses in Tennessee